The 1987 Duke Blue Devils football team represented the Duke Blue Devils of Duke University during the 1987 NCAA Division I-A football season.

Schedule

Personnel

Season summary

Georgia Tech

Steve Slayden threw 6 TD passes

References

Duke
Duke Blue Devils football seasons
Duke Blue Devils football